Fyodor Sergeyevich Dyachenko (born 4 May 1988) is a Russian former professional football player.

Club career
He made his Russian Football National League debut for FC Zvezda Irkutsk on 5 September 2008 in a game against FC Torpedo Moscow. He played 2 more seasons in the FNL for FC Mordovia Saransk and FC Fakel Voronezh.

Honours
 Russian Second Division, Zone Ural-Povolzhye best goalkeeper: 2009.

References

External links
 

1988 births
Sportspeople from Krasnodar
Living people
Russian footballers
Association football goalkeepers
FC Fakel Voronezh players
FC Mordovia Saransk players
FC Zvezda Irkutsk players
FC Armavir players
FC Rostov players
FC Sibir Novosibirsk players